Five Island Harbour is a large bay on the west coast of the island of Antigua, in Antigua and Barbuda. 

The town of Five Islands is on a peninsula along its northern shoreline.

See also

References 

Bays of Antigua and Barbuda
Saint John Parish, Antigua and Barbuda